Felice De Nicolò (born 22 March 1942) is a retired Italian alpine skier. He finished 25th in the downhill at the 1960 Winter Olympics and 28th in the giant slalom at the 1964 Winter Olympics. In 1964 he won the downhill and slalom events at the Three Cableways Cup.

References

External links
 

1942 births
Living people
Alpine skiers at the 1960 Winter Olympics
Alpine skiers at the 1964 Winter Olympics
Olympic alpine skiers of Italy
Italian male alpine skiers
People from Sëlva
Sportspeople from Südtirol